Tsvetkova bara or Tsvetkova Bara (also transcribed as Tzvetkova bara or Cvetkova bara) is a village (село) in northwestern Bulgaria, located in the Berkovitsa municipality of the Montana Province.

References

Villages in Montana Province